Olkhovatka is a rural locality (a selo) and the administrative center of Olkhovatskoye Rural Settlement, Verkhnemamonsky District, Voronezh Oblast, Russia. The population was 929 as of 2010. There are 11 streets.

Geography 
Olkhovatka is located 29 km west of Verkhny Mamon (the district's administrative centre) by road. Staraya Kalitva is the nearest rural locality.

References 

Rural localities in Verkhnemamonsky District